The Scheibe SF 40 is a German two-seat ultralight aircraft designed and built by Scheibe Aircraft.

Design
The SF 40 is a two-seat low-wing ultralight monoplane with a fixed tricycle landing gear. It has a fabric-covered steel-tube fuselage with fabric-covered glass-fibre wings. The first SF 40 powered by a Sauer four-stroke engine flew in 1995 but after five were built it was replaced in 1997 by an improved variant, the SF 40C. The SF 40C is powered by a Rotax 912 engine with a two-bladed propeller, a shorter wing span than the original with increased fuel capacity. The SF 40C was awarded a type certificate in May 1998.

Variants 
SF 40
Sauer-powered variant, five built.
SF 40C Allround
Rotax 912-powered variant.

Specifications (SF 40C)

References

Notes

Bibliography

 

1990s German civil utility aircraft
Motor gliders
Scheibe
Low-wing aircraft
Single-engined tractor aircraft
Aircraft first flown in 1995